In mathematics, a group G is called the direct sum of two normal subgroups with trivial intersection if it is generated by the subgroups. In abstract algebra, this method of construction of groups can be generalized to direct sums of vector spaces, modules, and other structures; see the article direct sum of modules for more information. A group which can be expressed as a direct sum of non-trivial subgroups is called decomposable, and if a group cannot be expressed as such a direct sum then it is called indecomposable.

Definition 
A group G is called the direct sum of two subgroups H1 and H2 if
 each H1 and H2 are normal subgroups of G,
 the subgroups H1 and H2 have trivial intersection (i.e., having only the identity element  of G in common),
 G = ⟨H1, H2⟩; in other words, G is generated by the subgroups H1 and H2.

More generally, G is called the  direct sum of a finite set of subgroups {Hi} if
 each Hi is a normal subgroup of G,
 each Hi has trivial intersection with the subgroup ,
 G = ⟨{Hi}⟩; in other words, G is generated by the subgroups {Hi}.

If G is the direct sum of subgroups H and K then we write , and if G is the direct sum of a set of subgroups {Hi} then we often write G = ΣHi. Loosely speaking, a direct sum is isomorphic to a weak direct product of subgroups.

Properties 
If , then it can be proven that:

 for all h in H, k in K, we have that 
 for all g in G, there exists unique h in H, k in K such that 
 There is a cancellation of the sum in a quotient; so that  is isomorphic to H

 if , then for all hi in Hi, hj in Hj, we have that 
 for each g in G, there exists a unique set of elements hi in Hi such that
g = h1 ∗ h2 ∗ ... ∗ hi ∗ ... ∗ hn
 There is a cancellation of the sum in a quotient; so that  is isomorphic to ΣHi.

Note the similarity with the direct product, where each g can be expressed uniquely as
g = (h1,h2, ..., hi, ..., hn).

Since  for all , it follows that multiplication of elements in a direct sum is isomorphic to multiplication of the corresponding elements in the direct product; thus for finite sets of subgroups, ΣHi is isomorphic to the direct product ×{Hi}.

Direct summand
Given a group , we say that a subgroup  is a direct summand of  if there exists another subgroup  of  such that .

Examples

 If we take   it is clear that  is the direct product of the subgroups .

 If  is a divisible subgroup of an abelian group  then there exists another subgroup  of  such that .

Equivalence of decompositions into direct sums

In the decomposition of a finite group into a direct sum of indecomposable subgroups the embedding of the subgroups is not unique. For example, in the Klein group  we have that
  and
 

However, the Remak-Krull-Schmidt theorem states that given a finite group G = ΣAi = ΣBj, where each Ai and each Bj is non-trivial and indecomposable, the two sums have equal terms up to reordering and isomorphism.

The Remak-Krull-Schmidt theorem fails for infinite groups; so in the case of infinite G = H + K = L + M, even when all subgroups are non-trivial and indecomposable, we cannot conclude that H is isomorphic to either L or M.

Generalization to sums over infinite sets

To describe the above properties in the case where G is the direct sum of an infinite (perhaps uncountable) set of subgroups, more care is needed.

If g is an element of the cartesian product Π{Hi} of a set of groups, let gi be the ith element of g in the product. The external direct sum of a set of groups {Hi} (written as ΣE{Hi}) is the subset of Π{Hi}, where, for each element g of ΣE{Hi}, gi is the identity  for all but a finite number of gi (equivalently, only a finite number of gi are not the identity). The group operation in the external direct sum is pointwise multiplication, as in the usual direct product.

This subset does indeed form a group, and for a finite set of groups {Hi} the external direct sum is equal to the direct product.

If G = ΣHi, then G is isomorphic to ΣE{Hi}. Thus, in a sense, the direct sum is an "internal" external direct sum. For each element g in G, there is a unique finite set S and a unique set {hi ∈ Hi : i ∈ S} such that g = Π {hi : i in S}.

See also
Direct sum
Coproduct
Free product
Direct sum of topological groups

References

Group theory